Live Consternation is a live album and video by Swedish heavy metal band Katatonia, released in both CD and DVD format through Peaceville Records on 28 May 2007. The double album features a live performance recorded at Germany's Summer Breeze Open Air festival, on 17 August 2006. The artwork was designed by Travis Smith and is close to the visual concept for The Great Cold Distance.

Track listing 
All songs written and composed by Jonas Renkse, Anders Nyström and Fredrik Norrman.

 "Leaders" – 5:11
 "Wealth" – 4:48
 "Soil's Song" – 4:15
 "Had To (Leave)" – 4:53
 "Cold Ways" – 5:23
 "Right into the Bliss" – 5:20
 "Ghost of the Sun" – 4:07
 "Criminals" – 4:03
 "Deliberation" – 4:05
 "July" – 4:42
 "Evidence" – 5:01

Notes

Tracks 1, 3, 9 & 10 from The Great Cold Distance
Tracks 2, 7, 8 & 11 from Viva Emptiness
Tracks 4 & 6 from Tonight's Decision
Track 5 from Discouraged Ones

Personnel 
Band
Jonas Renkse – vocals
Anders Nyström – guitar, backing vocals
Fredrik Norrman – guitar
Mattias Norrman – bass
Daniel Liljekvist – drums

Production
Travis Smith – art director, artwork, designer
Petri Eskelinen – photography
Ronald Matthes – director, executive producer
Erik Fugmann-Brandt – editor
Roaxfilms – producer
Kaja Kargus – executive producer
David Castillo – mixing engineer, mastering engineer

References 

Katatonia albums
2007 live albums
Albums with cover art by Travis Smith (artist)